Vasil Metodiev ((6 January 1935 – 29 July 2019) was a Bulgarian football midfielder who played for Bulgaria in the 1966 FIFA World Cup. He also played for Lokomotiv Sofia. He was the legendary coach of Levski Sofia, where he won three Bulgarian championships in 1984, 1985 and 1988, two Bulgarian Cup titles in 1984 and 1991, two Cup of the Soviet Army titles in 1984 and 1988, including one treble in 1984. In 1984–85 season, as coach of Levski, he eliminated German champions VfB Stuttgart for the European Cup, which makes Metodiev the only Bulgarian coach to have knocked out a Bundesliga winner.

References

External links

1935 births
2019 deaths
Bulgarian footballers
Bulgaria international footballers
Association football midfielders
FC Lokomotiv 1929 Sofia players
First Professional Football League (Bulgaria) players
1966 FIFA World Cup players
Macedonian Bulgarians
Bulgarian football managers
PFC Levski Sofia managers
FC Lokomotiv 1929 Sofia managers
People from Sandanski
OFC Vihren Sandanski managers
PFC Pirin Blagoevgrad managers
Sportspeople from Blagoevgrad Province
20th-century Bulgarian people